Kaettekita Kogarashi Monjirō is a 1993 Japanese film directed by Kon Ichikawa. It is based on Saho Sasazawa's novel, and is a sequel to the jidaigeki TV drama series Kogarashi Monjirō.

Plot
Kogarashi Monjirō falls from a cliff during a fight, he is picked up and cared for by Denkichi, a lumberjack. For a while, Monjirō lost his memory and worked as a lumberjack. While he eventually regains his memory, Denkichi, is seriously injured and asks him to bring back his son, who has become a member of a yakuza clan. Monjirō decides to go to Jōshu to accomplish the mission.

Cast
Atsuo Nakamura as Kogarashi Monjirō
Ryōko Sakaguchi as Omachi
Takeshi Katō  as Kiso no Denkichi
Ittoku Kishibe as Kizaki no Gorozo
Kyōka Suzuki as Otami
Kazuhiko Kanayama as Koheiji
Akiji Kobayashi as Jubei
Isao Vitō as Toranosuke
Takeo Nakahara as Hachibei
Renji Ishibashi as Morisuke Asaka
Shigeru Kōyama as Tomiokaya

References

External links

Films directed by Kon Ichikawa
Jidaigeki films
Samurai films
Films with screenplays by Kon Ichikawa
1990s Japanese films